Cossonus disciferus, is a species of weevil found in Sri Lanka.

Description
Similar to Cossonus ochreipennis. Rostrum elongate. The apex of the rostrum and legs are reddish brown. Apex of elytra is black, and median impression of pronotum interrupted in the middle and not carinate.

References 

Curculionidae
Insects of Sri Lanka